Blau syndrome is an autosomal dominant genetic inflammatory disorder which affects the skin, eyes, and joints. It is caused by a mutation in the NOD2 (CARD15) gene. Symptoms usually begin before the age of four, and the disease manifests as early onset cutaneous sarcoidosis, granulomatous arthritis, and uveitis.

Presentation

Cause
The discovery that the gene defect in Blau syndrome involves the CARD15/NOD2 gene has sparked investigation into its function as part of the innate immune system. The innate immune system recognizes pathogen-associated molecular patterns, including bacterial polysaccharides such as muramyl dipeptide, via its pattern recognition receptors, such as NOD2, to induce signaling pathways that activate cytokine responses and protect the organism. In Blau syndrome, the genetic defect seems to lead to overactivation and poor control of the inflammatory response leading to widespread granulomatous inflammation and tissue damage.

Diagnosis

Treatment
Treatment has included anti-inflammatory drugs such as adrenal glucocorticoids, anti-metabolites, and biological agents such as anti-TNF and infliximab all with varying degrees of success.

History 
In 1981, Malleson et al. reported a family that had autosomal dominant synovitis, camptodactyly, and iridocyclitis. One member died of granulomatous arteritis of the heart and aorta.

In 1982, Rotenstein reported a family with granulomatous arteritis, rash, iritis, and arthritis transmitted as an autosomal dominant trait over three generations.

In 1985, Edward Blau, a pediatrician in Marshfield, Wisconsin, reported a family that over four generations had granulomatous inflammation of the skin, eyes and joints. The condition was transmitted as an autosomal dominant trait. In the same year Jabs et al. reported a family that over two generations had granulomatous synovitis, uveitis and cranial neuropathies. The condition was transmitted in an autosomal dominant fashion.

Then in 1990 Pastores et al. reported a kindred with a phenotype very similar to what Blau described and suggested that the condition be called Blau syndrome. They also pointed out the similarities in the families noted above to Blau syndrome but also pointed out the significant differences in the phenotypes.

In 1996 Tromp et al. conducted a genome wide search using affected and non affected members of the original family. A marker, D16S298, gave a maximum logarithm of odds score of 3.75 and put the Blau syndrome susceptibility locus within the 16p12-q21 interval.  Hugot et al. found a susceptibility locus for Crohn disease, a granulomatous inflammation of the bowel, on chromosome 16 close to the locus for BS. Based on the above information Blau suggested in 1998 that the genetic defect in Blau syndrome and Crohn Disease might be the same or similar.

Finally in 2001 Miceli-Richard et al. found the defect in Blau syndrome to be in the nucleotide-binding domain of CARD15/NOD2. They commented in their article that mutations in CARD15 had also been found in Crohn's disease. Confirmation of the defect in Blau syndrome being in the CARD15 gene was made by Wang et al. in 2002 using the Blau syndrome family and others. With that information the diagnosis of Blau syndrome was not only determined by phenotype but by genotype. Early onset sarcoidosis is Blau syndrome without a family history, Blau syndrome has been diagnosed in patients who have not only the classic triad but granuloma in multiple organs.

See also 
 List of cutaneous conditions

References

Further reading
 Wouters CH, Maes A, Foley KP, Bertin J, and Rose CD: Blau Syndrome, the prototypic auto-inflammatory granulomatous disease. Pediatric Rheumatology 2014;12:33. .  .  .
 Blau EB : Familial Granulomatous Arthritis, Iritis, and Rash. The Journal of Pediatrics 1985; 107: 689-693.  .  .
 Jabs DA, Houk JL, Bias WB, and Arnett FC: Familial Granulomatous Synovitis, Uveitis, and Cranial Neuropathies. The American Journal of Medicine 1985; 78: 801–804.  .  .
 Malleson P, Schaller JG, Dega F, Cassidy SB, and Pagon RA : Familial Arthritis and Camplodactyly. Arthritis and Rheumatism 1981; 24: 1199–1204.  .  .
 Rotenstein D, Gibbas DL, Majmudar B, and Chastain EA: Familial Granulomatous Arteritis with Polyarthritis of Juvenile Onset. The New England Journal of Medicine 1982; 306: 85–90. .  .
 Pastores GM, Michels VV, Stickler GB, Su WP, Nelson AM, and Bovenmyer DA: Autosomal dominant granulomatous arthritis, uveitis, skin rash, and synovial cysts. The Journal of Pediatrics 1990; 117: 403–408.  .  .
 Tromp G, Kuivaniemi H, Raphael S, et al.: Genetic Linkage of Familial Granulomatous Inflammatory Arthritis, Skin Rash, and Uveitis to Chromosome 16. The American Journal of Human Genetics 1996; 59: 1097-1107.  .  .
 Hugot JP, Chamaillard M, Zouali H, et al.: Association of NOD2 leucine-rich repeat variants with susceptibility to Crohn's disease. Nature 2001; 411:599-603.  .  .
 Blau EB : Autosomal dominant granulomatous disease of childhood: The naming of things. The Journal of Pediatrics 1998; 133: 322–323.  .  .
 Miceli-Richard C, Lesage S, Rybojad M, Prieur A-M, Manouvrier-Hanu S, Häfner R, Chamaillard M, Zouali H, Thomas G, and Hugot J-P: CARD15 mutations in Blau syndrome. Nature Genetics 2001; 29: 19-20.  .  .
 Wang X, Kuivaniemi H, Bonavita G, Mutkus L, Mau U, Blau E, Inohara N, Nunez G, Tromp G, and Williams CJ: CARD15 Mutations in Familial Granulomatous Syndromes: A Study of the Original Blau Syndrome Kindred and Other Families with Large-Vessel Arteritis and Cranial Neuropathy. Arthritis and Rheumatism 2002; 46: 3041-3045.  .  .
 Caso F, Galozzi P, Costa L, Sfriso P, Cantarini L, and Punzi L; Autoinflammatory granulomatous diseases: from Blau syndrome and early-onset sarcoidosis to NOD2-mediated disease and Crohn's disease. RMD Open 2015; 1: e000097.  .  .  .

External links 

 Blau Syndrome in Orpha website

Autoinflammatory syndromes
Genodermatoses